Elvira Hernández (pseudonym of Rosa María Teresa Adriasola Olave; born 2 July 1951) is a Chilean poet, essayist, and literary critic.

Biography
Rosa María Teresa Adriasola Olave was born in Lebu on 2 July 1951. She began writing poetry at an early age. Her basic education took place in Chillán. After the 1973 coup d'état by General Augusto Pinochet against the Popular Unity government, in 1975, she studied literature at the Department of Humanistic Studies of the Faculty of Physical Sciences and Mathematics, then directed by Cristián Huneeus, with teachers such as Jorge Guzmán, Enrique Lihn, and Nicanor Parra.

To date, she has not produced any testimony about this fact, explaining in a 2016 interview, "It is something that I cannot do yet, because you have to have the right perspective." The following year, she began to write La bandera de Chile while "under a lot of pressure".

The book, a diary of poetic reflections on Chile and its emblems, would not be formally published for 10 years. It circulated clandestinely in the form of mimeographed copies during the military dictatorship, and those poems became symbolic of the resistance.

In 1986, ¡Arre! Halley Arre! was released, and since then Elvira Hernández has continued to publish both poetry books and essays (the latter signed with her real name, Teresa Adriasola).

Her work has been associated with "neo-avant-garde" poets such as Raúl Zurita, Soledad Fariña, Verónica Zondek and Juan Luis Martínez. However, the author has another opinion:

She has written essays jointly with Soledad Fariña and Verónica Zondek.

Awards
 Finalist for the 2012 Altazor Award for Cuaderno de deportes
 Career award at the 2017 La Chascona Poetry Festival
 2018 Jorge Teillier National Poetry Award
 2018 Pablo Neruda Ibero-American Poetry Award
 2018 Circle of Art Critics' Award, Poetry category for the book Pájaros desde mi ventana

Works
 La bandera de Chile, finished writing in 1981; mimeographs circulated clandestinely in Chile and published 10 years later, with presentation by : Libros de Tierra Firme, Buenos Aires, 1991; Cuneta, Santiago, 2010
 ¡Arre! Halley ¡Arre!, Ergo Sum, Santiago, 1986
 Meditaciones físicas por un hombre que se fue, Arte postal, Santiago, 1987
 Carta de viaje, Ediciones Último Reino, Buenos Aires, 1989
 El orden de los días, Roldanillo, Colombia, 1991
 Santiago Waria, Cuarto Propio, Santiago, 1992
 Merodeos en torno a la obra poética de Juan Luis Martínez, together with Soledad Fariña; Intemperie, Santiago, 2001
 Álbum de Valparaíso, LOM Ediciones, Santiago, 2002
 Cuaderno de deportes, Cuarto Propio, Santiago, 2010
 Actas urbe, with prologue by Guido Arroyo, Alquimia Ediciones, Santiago, 2013
 Los trabajos y los días, anthology; selection, edition, and notes by Vicente Undurraga, Editorial Lumen, Santiago, 2016
 Pájaros desde mi ventana, Alquimia Ediciones, Santiago, 2018

References

External links

 Elvira Hernández (1951–) at Memoria Chilena

1951 births
21st-century Chilean poets
21st-century Chilean women writers
Chilean essayists
Chilean literary critics
Chilean women essayists
Chilean women poets
Living people
People from Arauco Province
University of Chile alumni
Women literary critics